Van Helsing is a fantasy horror drama television series. Kelly Overton plays the titular character of the series, which was inspired by Zenescope Entertainment's graphic novel series Helsing. A commercial-free advance preview of the pilot aired on July 31, 2016 on Syfy ahead of its September 23, 2016 premiere. In December 2019, Syfy renewed the series for a fifth and final season which premiered on April 16, 2021, and concluded on June 25, 2021.

Plot
Van Helsing is set in a post-apocalyptic near future. Vanessa Van Helsing, a descendant of Abraham Van Helsing, awakens from a coma after her supposed death to find herself in a post-apocalyptic world, three years after an eruption of the Yellowstone Caldera had blanketed the world in ash, blocking out sunlight and allowing vampires to overrun humanity. She is humanity's last hope, as her unique blood composition gives her the ability to turn vampires back into humans. With this secret weapon, Vanessa becomes a prime target for the vampires. She is protected by a Marine ordered to keep her safe, and the doctor who saved her, so she can lead a resistance against the vampires that plague the world's survivors.

In the second season, Vanessa journeys east towards the safe haven of Denver, Colorado and discovers her long-lost sister Scarlett, who has been trained to kill vampires since birth. In the third season, Vanessa and Scarlett hunt the Elders, the original vampires, in order to defeat them for good. Following Vanessa's apparent death in the fourth season, the series switches focus to her long-lost biological daughters Violet and Jack as they face a new "daywalker" breed of vampires as well as the "Dark One" and ruler of the vampire species, Countess Olivia von Dracula and her brides, a former countess of Transylvania and de facto President of the United States.

Cast and characters

Main

 Kelly Overton as Vanessa Van Helsing (formerly Vanessa Seward), humanity's last hope to lead an offensive to take back what has been lost in a post-Rising world, as her unique blood composition gives her the ability to turn vampires back into humans.
 Jonathan Scarfe as Axel Miller, a former Marine with unwavering devotion and loyalty to both duty and Vanessa, despite years of isolation. He is later turned whilst saving the other survivors but thanks to Vanessa's abilities, he later becomes human once again. He gains enhanced abilities from this, becoming immune to vampirism and has increased strength and healing abilities. He eventually forms a romantic relationship with Scarlett.
 Christopher Heyerdahl as Samuel "Sam" (seasons 1–4; guest season 5), a deaf survivor of the Rising who relies on his strength and observational skills to stay hidden. Sam turns out to be the serial killer haunting the survivors. He likes to strangle his victims and cut off the right index finger, collecting them like the Indian mythological character Angulimāla (meaning "finger necklace"). After his secret was uncovered by Mohamad, he explains to Vanessa that he had always been a killer. Vanessa cuts his tendons and leaves him to die but a feral vampire turns him. He soon becomes a sociopathic vampire, hunting Vanessa for revenge. He is later transformed into the Fourth vampire elder and soon meets his death at the hands of Dracula upon her emergence.
 David Cubitt as John  (main season 1; guest season 3), a survivor of the Rising whose actions are fueled by anger, prejudice, suspicion and fear. He was killed by Vanessa with a knife after severed fingers were found in his bag.
 Vincent Gale as Phil "Flesh" Fleischman (seasons 1–4), a vampire who was originally a human named Phil Fleishman. He became one of the first vampires turned by Julius during the Rising. After the Rising, he served as one of Dimitri's top lieutenants and was sent to bite "the dead woman", Vanessa. As a result, he was cured and regained his humanity. He is haunted by his memories of killing his children in front of his wife and leaving her alive with their dismembered bodies. He later begins searching for his wife Jennifer to make amends and after rescuing her, leaves to find a new home.
 Rukiya Bernard as Sarah "Doc" Carol (seasons 1–3; "Special Guest Star" seasons 4–5), a Seattleite medical examiner and scientist. She was a vampire before being cured by Vanessa. She struggled with being turned human again and, after abandoning Axel to die, tried to get a vampire to turn her back but it turned out that Vanessa's bite has immunized her against vampirism. She later starts a relationship with Jolene.
 Trezzo Mahoro as Mohamad (main seasons 1–2; recurring season 3; guest season 5), a happy guy, despite all of the evil in the world. He and Sam have a strong bond. He works to deliver Vanessa to Dimitri so that he can set his sister free, only to find that she is happy with the arrangement she has, living in relative luxury and safety as a result of informing on the resistance to Rebecca. He is later turned by Sam and is then stabbed to death by him.
 Tim Guinee as Ted (season 1), a Marine and a friend of Axel Miller. After making a deal with the vampires to turn over Vanessa, he is killed by her.
 Laura Mennell as Rebecca (seasons 1–2), an ancient, high-ranking vampire who sees very little use in human life. Rebecca works with Taka in secret to overthrow Dimitri. She also turned Dylan, Vanessa's daughter, into a vampire. Rebecca is weakened in a fight with Vanessa, in which Vanessa holds her face to the sun, burning it, and is then killed by Dmitri's sister Antanasia.
 Paul Johansson as Dmitri (seasons 1–2), a vampire turned long before the Rising. He is now a patient and calculating vampire leader, who's obsessed with finding Vanessa, whom he believes to be the solution to the vampire dream of walking in daylight. He is killed by the First Elder, on Scarlett's command.
 Aleks Paunovic as Julius (main seasons 1, 4–5; recurring seasons 2–3), a former vampire turned by Dmitri who existed for some time before The Rising as a warlord and leader of his own vampire brood. He is turned human by Vanessa and now fights alongside her and her allies, now with enhanced abilities.
 Hilary Jardine as Susan Jackson (main season 1; guest seasons 2–3, 5), Vanessa's neighbor and best friend up until The Rising, during which time she became a vampire. She was later cured upon reuniting with Vanessa but is soon murdered by Sam. The First Elder, one of the original vampires, takes Susan's form, so as to facilitate interaction with Vanessa and the others.
 Missy Peregrym as Scarlett Van Helsing, formerly Scarlett Harker; (seasons 2–3; credited as "Special Guest Star"; voice-only guest seasons 4–5), Vanessa's sister, who shares some of Vanessa's special abilities. She later forms a romantic relationship with Axel.
 Caroline Cave as Jolene (recurring seasons 2–3; main seasons 4–5), a triage nurse in a camp of human survivors. She later becomes romantically involved with Doc.
 Jennifer Cheon Garcia as Ivory (recurring seasons 2–4; main season 5), the former leader of the Sisterhood, an all-female faction of very powerful vampires. She eventually joins the survivors after becoming human after being bitten by Violet and starts a relationship with Jack.
 Jesse Stanley as Bathory / The Oracle (guest season 2; recurring seasons 3–4; main season 5), a former vampire hunter who becomes one of the bridesmaids of Dracula. She is an enigmatic oracle who guides vampires towards their destiny, specifically Sam, and later turns him into the fourth vampire elder.
 John Cassini as Maddox (guest season 3; main season 4), an underling of Hansen who is in charge of operations in Denver.
 Neal McDonough as Willem / Hansen, aka "The Boss" (main season 4; "special guest star" in "Birth Ritual"; guest season 5), the bridesman of Dracula and the ruthless head of Blak-Tek. He is revealed to be an ancient vampire named Willem.
 Keeya King as Violet Van Helsing (seasons 4–5), Hansen's adopted daughter, whom Julius is assigned to train, and a biological daughter of Vanessa Van Helsing.
 Nicole Muñoz as Jacqueline "Jack" Van Helsing (seasons 4–5), the teenage leader of a group of survivors, Hansen's adopted daughter and a biological daughter of Vanessa Van Helsing. She is later transported back in time to Transylvania to steal Dracula's power before returning to the present.
 Tricia Helfer as Countess Olivia / Dracula (seasons 4–5), known as the "Dark One", who is the ruler of the vampire species and was once the countess of Transylvania. She eventually kills the U.S. president and takes over The White House with plans to destroy what remains of the human world.
 Heather Doerksen as Michaela (recurring season 4; main season 5), a bridesmaid of Dracula who is the Mother and original leader of The Sisterhood. She is eventually trapped and killed by Jack and Ivory.
 Kim Coates as Count Dalibor (season 5), the ruler of Transylvania and the husband of Countess Olivia. He is turned into a vampire by Dracula, and back to human by Jack, but succumbs to his injuries.
 Dan Cade as Roberto (season 5), a vampire hunter based in Transylvania who hunts down members of The Sisterhood alongside Bathory, prior to her becoming a vampire. He later protects the baby Jack Van Helsing, son of Count Dalibor and Countess Olivia, who would go on to become the first of the Van Helsing family.

Recurring
 Hannah Cheramy as Dylan (recurring seasons 1–2, guest seasons 3, 5), the daughter of Vanessa. Vanessa eventually finds her with Rebecca where her DNA has been altered by Dr. Sholomenko so that a bite from Vanessa will be fatal. Vanessa initially tries to keep her alive by feeding her human blood.
 Terry Chen as Brendan (season 1), the de facto leader of a group of survivors from Idaho. They take over the hospital, imprisoning Axel and the others. After breaking free, Axel sends him and the remaining Idaho survivors out of the hospital to fend for themselves. He survives and joins the resistance, meeting up with Flesh again.
 Jennifer Copping as Quaid (season 1), a member of the Portland Human Resistance.
 Ben Cotton as Campbell (season 1), a member of the Portland Human Resistance.
 Gia Crovatin as Anastasia (seasons 1–2), an ancient vampire like her brother Dmitri.
 John DeSantis as Gustov (season 1), a notable vampire from Julius' Brood.
 Sarah Desjardins as Catherine (season 1), a member of a group of survivors from Idaho, who was lucky enough to be rescued by Vanessa as they passed through Seattle.
 Christina Jastrzembska as Mama (recurring season 1; guest seasons 2, 5), the mother of Julius, as well as a member of his Brood. She is killed by Sam as she tries to extract information from him about Mohamad. Mama was dying in a charity hospital in the 1920s when she was turned by Julius in a desperate effort to save her. She appears in flashbacks related to Julius' origins.
 Macie Juiles as Callie (recurring seasons 1–3; guest seasons 4–5), a member of a group of survivors from Idaho, who after being saved Vanessa, forged a bond with her. She is known for everyone around her dying but she always survives. She helps Axel when he first escaped from the locked quarantine section at the farm, supplying him with blood so that he does not have to kill. Later, she joins another group of young people known as "the Johnson's", where she meets up with Vanessa again. After the group disbands, she eventually joins the community of survivors at Denver, and later shows up to help Ivory.
 Avery Konrad as Cynthia (season 1), an average teenage girl that somehow managed to survive The Rising for as long as she did.
 Duncan Ollerenshaw as Dr. Sholomenko (recurring season 1; guest season 2), a human doctor, who was forced into working for Dmitri and Rebecca in order to create day walking vampires with components from Vanessa's blood.
 Rowland Pidlubny as Scab (seasons 1–4), a vampire servant from Julius' brood who later joins the Sisterhood. He ends up killing the human Frankie, Julius' lover, who then vowed revenge.
 Ryan Robbins as Taka (recurring season 1; guest season 2), a leader of the Portland Human Resistance. Taka aligned himself with Rebecca, who wanted to overthrow Dimitri. Rebecca promised him 'Fox Island' as a place where humans could live without interference from the vampires.
 Naika Toussaint as Sheema (recurring season 1; guest season 2), the sister of Mohamad who is a member of the Portland Human Resistance. She was found out and used as a spy to trap other members of the resistance. She is desperate to be turned into a vampire and implores Mohamad to get one to do it when she is trapped under rubble during the resistance attack on Dmitri's headquarters.
 Gwynyth Walsh as Magdalene (season 1), a vampire in allegiance with Julius who, as a human, was Micah's ex-wife.
 Alison Wandzura as Nicole (season 1), a survivor held up in the Seattle Valley General Hospital until it was overrun with vampires.
 Andrea Ware as Lucky (season 2), a member of the Portland Human Resistance. She becomes Flesh's friend and eventual lover.
 Keith Arbuthnot as Abaddon (seasons 2–3), the first vampire elder and the oldest living vampire in existence. After being freed, he promises to serve the Van Helsings.
 Phil Burke as Mike (seasons 2–3), Chad's boyfriend and the co-leader of a group of mostly children refugees who hide out in the woods known as 'The Johnsons'.
 Donny Lucas as Chad (seasons 2–4), Mike's boyfriend and the co-leader of a group of mostly children refugees who hide out in the woods known as 'The Johnsons'. He is eventually one of two remaining survivors after the group is wiped out, alongside the child survivor Tabby.
 John Reardon as Dr. Bruce Harrison (recurring season 2; guest season 3), a human performing experiments involving vampirism in a mountain fortress. He shares a mysterious connection to the Van Helsings.
 Andee Frizzell as Abigail Van Helsing / The Boss (recurring season 2; guest season 3), a scientist who works with Dr. Harrison, and claims to be Vanessa and Scarlett's mother.
 Julie Lynn Mortensen as Lillian "Lily" Van Helsing (recurring season 3; guest season 4), Vanessa's great great-grandmother, a member of the Van Helsing family who lived in the late 19th to early 20th Century, and a vampire hunter. After being held in suspended animation, she awakens in the present day.
 Jennifer Spence as B'ah (season 3), the second vampire elder who fought against Lillian Van Helsing in the 19th century.
 Michael Jonsson as Barry (season 3), one of a group of survivors whom Vanessa, Scarlett and Axel come across in San Francisco.
 Danny Wattley as Dre (season 3), one of a group of survivors whom Vanessa, Scarlett and Axel come across in San Francisco.
 Vanessa Walsh as Marybeth (season 3), the leader of a group of survivors whom Vanessa, Scarlett and Axel come across in San Francisco.
 Kendall Cross as Frankie (season 3), a bartender in Denver who forms a relationship with Julius.
 Anna Galvin as Avery (season 4; guest season 5), who works with Hansen at Fort Collins and is very interested in finding a "cure" for vampirism. Later, she is killed by Bathory who takes her form and impersonates her in order to infiltrate Fort Collins.
 Richard Harmon as Max Borman (season 4), a sadistic prison warden and a smuggler. He is an enhanced human like Axel and Julius, and can heal very fast.
 Luvia Petersen as Sgt. Weathers (season 5), a member of the military who interrogates Ivory and Violet, but she is later convinced by Violet that the President has been replaced by Dracula, and joins the Resistance.

Special guest stars
 Sara Canning as Polly Miller / Carter ("Been Away"), the anti-social member of a group of survivors in Axel's hometown, who is Axel's long-lost sister.
 Michael Eklund as Abraham Van Helsing ("Metamorphosis") and as Jacob Van Helsing ("The Prism"), The former is the original patriarch of the Van Helsing family who managed to previously trap the Dark One, and the latter is Abraham's twin brother, who was turned into a vampire by Hansen, and who later become the third vampire elder who Vanessa and Scarlett discover trapped on an island.

Development and production
Syfy acquired Van Helsing from Nomadic Pictures in November 2015, with a 13-episode order beginning production in January 2016, and a series premiere scheduled for Fall 2016. On October 14, 2016, Syfy renewed Van Helsing for a 13-episode second season, which premiered on October 5, 2017. It was revealed during San Diego Comic-Con 2017 that series star Kelly Overton was pregnant during the production of the second season of Van Helsing.

On December 19, 2017, Syfy renewed Van Helsing for a 13-episode third season, which premiered on October 5, 2018. Syfy renewed the series for a 13-episode fourth season on December 18, 2018. After three seasons, Neil LaBute stepped down as showrunner, with series writer Jonathan Walker taking over as showrunner for season 4. On December 17, 2019, Syfy renewed the series for a fifth and final season. The fifth season premiered on April 16, 2021.

Casting
It was announced on May 14, 2019, that Tricia Helfer had been cast as Dracula in the fourth season, and that Richard Harmon, Nicole Munoz, Keeya King and The Big Show will join the series in its fourth season, in undisclosed roles.

Episodes

Series overview

Season 1 (2016)

Season 2 (2017–18)

Season 3 (2018)
All the episodes in Season 3 were named after songs by Soundgarden. In addition, the penultimate episode's title is the censored version of "Jesus Christ Pose".

Season 4 (2019)

Season 5 (2021)

Broadcast and release

Syfy aired a commercial-free preview of the pilot on July 31, 2016; this was followed by the series premiere on September 23, 2016.

The series was originally slated to premiere in Canada on Super Channel, but because of Super Channel's ongoing bankruptcy proceedings, the series was ultimately dropped from their schedule and instead premiered on Netflix on December 23, 2016.

Reception

The series' pilot episode received 4.5 stars from Den of Geek. In his review of Van Helsing, Keith Uhlich of The Hollywood Reporter wrote: "It's pretty good... or is at least, to quote that old critic's saw, 'better than it has any right to be'."

Awards and nominations

See also
 List of fantasy television programs
 List of horror television programs
 List of vampire television series
 List of science fiction TV and radio shows produced in Canada

Notes

References

External links
 
 
 Van Helsing on Netflix
 Van Helsing  at Garn's Guides
 

2010s American drama television series
2010s American horror television series
2010s American supernatural television series
2010s Canadian drama television series
2016 American television series debuts
2016 Canadian television series debuts
2020s American drama television series
2020s American horror television series
2020s American supernatural television series
2020s Canadian drama television series
2021 American television series endings
American action television series
American fantasy drama television series
American fantasy television series
Apocalyptic television series
Canadian action television series
Canadian fantasy television series
Canadian horror fiction television series
Canadian supernatural television series
English-language television shows
Post-apocalyptic television series
Serial drama television series
Syfy original programming
Television shows filmed in Vancouver
Television series set in 2019
Vampires in television